Yves Pozzo di Borgo (born 3 May 1948) is a French politician, born in Ajaccio, Corsica. He was a member of the Senate of France from 2004 to 2017, representing the city of Paris for the Centrist Union.

Political career
In parliament, Pozzo di Borgo was the deputy chairman of the Committee on European Affairs. He also served on the Committee on Foreign Affairs and on the Defence Committee.

In addition to his committee assignments, Pozzo di Borgo was the president of the Parliamentary Friendship Group with Central Asia (Kazakhstan, Kyrgyzstan, Uzbekistan, Tadjikistan, Turkmenistan) and a member of the French delegation to the Parliamentary Assembly of the Organization for Security and Co-operation in Europe.

Pozzo di Borgo publicly endorsed François Bayrou in the 2012 presidential elections.

From 2004 until 2017, Pozzo di Borgo also served as member of the French delegation to the Parliamentary Assembly of the Council of Europe. In this capacity, he was a member of the Committee on Political Affairs and Democracy; the Committee on Rules of Procedure, Immunities and Institutional Affairs; and the Sub-Committee on Crime Problems and the Fight against Terrorism. He had previously been the Assembly's rapporteur on the European Court of Human Rights (2015) and on the protection of human rights defenders (2017).

In July 2015, Pozzo di Borgo accompanied Thierry Mariani and 10 other party members on a controversial visit  to the recently annexed Crimea.

In 2016, Pozzo di Borgo publicly endorsed Nathalie Kosciusko-Morizet in the Republicans' primaries for the 2017 presidential elections.

Other activities
 Association Dialogue Franco-Russe, Member of the Bureau
 Institut Jean Lecanuet, President

References

Links
Page on the Senate website

1948 births
Living people
Centre of Social Democrats politicians
Union for French Democracy politicians
The Centrists politicians
Democratic European Force politicians
French Senators of the Fifth Republic
Union of Democrats and Independents politicians
Senators of Paris
Politicians from Ajaccio
Councillors of Paris